Maria Filatova (born 27 December 1980) is an Estonian footballer.

She was born in Tallinn.

Club career:
 Arsenal-90 (1995–1996)
 TKSK Arsenal (1996–1998)
 TKSK (1999–2000)
 TKSK Visa (2001–2005) 
 FC Levadia (2006–2008).

1999-2006 she played for Estonia women's national football team.

In 2001 she was chosen to Estonian Female Footballer of the Year.

References

Living people
1980 births
Estonian women's footballers
FC Flora (women) players
Footballers from Tallinn
Women's association footballers not categorized by position